Punggol Station is a commonly used name for Punggol MRT/LRT station – a Singapore Mass Rapid Transit (MRT) and Light Rail Transit (LRT) station, on the North East MRT (NEL) and Punggol LRT (PGLRT) lines.

Other stations that contain the name "Punggol" are:

Punggol Point LRT station, an LRT station on the west loop of the PGLRT.
Punggol Coast MRT station, a station under construction on the NEL.
Punggol LRT line.

See also
 Punggol